National Highway 752E, commonly referred to as NH 752E is a national highway in  India. It is a spur road of National Highway 52. NH-752E traverses the state of Maharashtra in India.

Route 

Paithan, Mungi, Bodhegaon, Ghoanaspargaon, Ukhanda Chakla, Midsangvi, Shirur Kasar, Rakshasbhuwan, Kholyachiwadi, Kharegaon, Dongarkinhi, Chumbli, Patoda, Pargaon(Ghumra), Dighol and terminating at [[Kharda
Tintraj, Dandegaon, Khandeshwarwadi, Ratnapur, Anala, 
Kandari, Paranda, Mungshi, Loni, 
Bitargaon, Kave, Mahadeowadi, Pandharpur .

Junctions  

 NH 752F Terminal near Paithan.
 
 
  near Patoda.

See also 

 List of National Highways in India
 List of National Highways in India by state

References

External links 

 NH 752E on OpenStreetMap

National highways in India
National Highways in Maharashtra